Thomas Thompson Land (December 17, 1815 – June 27, 1893) was an associate justice of the Louisiana Supreme Court from November 1, 1858, to April 3, 1865.

Biography
Born in Rutherford County, Tennessee, with his parents Land moved first to Alabama, and then to Mississippi. He graduated from the University of Virginia, and was a member of the Mississippi Legislature in 1839. He moved to Shreveport, Louisiana in 1846, and was a judge of the District Court from 1854 to 1858, when he became a justice of the Louisiana Supreme Court. He served as a member of the Convention of 1879, where he was chairman of the judiciary committee. He was the father of Justices Alfred D. Land, and John R. Land. He died Shreveport, La.

References

External links

 
 

1815 births
1893 deaths
19th-century American judges
19th-century American politicians
Justices of the Louisiana Supreme Court
Members of the Mississippi Legislature
People from Rutherford County, Tennessee
People from Shreveport, Louisiana
People of Louisiana in the American Civil War
University of Virginia alumni